Stacey Ann Allaster  (born July 12, 1963) was the Chairman and CEO of the Women’s Tennis Association from 2009 to 2015.

Early life
Allaster was born in Windsor, Ontario and grew up in Welland, Ontario. She started playing tennis at age 12. She attended Notre Dame College School and received her Bachelor of Arts in Economics and Physical Education from the University of Western Ontario in 1985 and a Master of Business Administration from the Richard Ivey School of Business in 2000.

Career
Allaster was a member of the Welland Tennis Club, where she learned how to play tennis. She also taught tennis to children and adults. After graduating from university, she worked for the Ontario Tennis Association as membership sales co-ordinator and director of player development.

She became the Vice President of Sales and Marketing and Tournament Director of the Rogers Cup. On January 1, 2006, she was appointed to be the President of Women's Tennis Association, a newly created role in the organization.

In July 2009, Allaster was promoted to be the chairman and CEO of the WTA Tour, succeeding Larry Scott.

In 2011, the WTA Board of Directors extended Allaster's CEO contract through 2017. 

While serving as CEO, the WTA secured one billion dollars in diversified contracted revenues. Allaster also oversaw the partnership of an international media agreement.

On September 22, 2015 Allaster announced her retirement as chief executive of the WTA citing a personal change in priorities. The transition took effect October 2, 2015. On October 5, 2015, Steve Simon, the Tournament Director of the BNP Paribas Open was announced to succeed Allaster as the new WTA chairman and CEO.

Personal life
Allaster currently resides in St. Petersburg, Florida with her husband, John Milkovich and their children, Jack and Alex. Jack and Alexandra were adopted from Kemerovo, Russia.

References

External links
Women’s tennis CEO Stacey Allaster on equal pay, sexy tennis garb, and Venus
Advantage, Allaster: How this Canadian rose to the top
CEO Stacey Allaster works to widen WTA Tour's global appeal
Tennis: Courting favour

Living people
Canadian sports executives and administrators
Sportspeople from Welland
Sportspeople from Windsor, Ontario
University of Western Ontario alumni
Sportspeople from St. Petersburg, Florida
Canadian expatriate sportspeople in the United States
WTA Tour
1963 births
Canadian emigrants to the United States
Companions of the Order of Canada